Eurypauropodidae is a family of pauropods. The family was first described by the American zoologist John A. Ryder during October 1873. Eurypauropodids are generally less than 1 millimeter long, and their outer plates are usually completely sclerotised.

References

External links

Myriapod families